The 1982 Penn Quakers football team was an American football team that represented the University of Pennsylvania during the 1982 NCAA Division I-AA football season. Penn was one of three co-champions of the Ivy League.

In their second year under head coach Jerry Berndt, the Quakers compiled a 7–3 record and outscored opponents 221 to 192. Tom Roland and Boris Radisic were the team captains.

Penn's 5–2 conference put it in a three-way tie atop the Ivy League standings. The Quakers outscored Ivy opponents 160 to 127. Penn won the head-to-head matchups with its co-champions, defeating Dartmouth in the first week of the season and beating Harvard in the second-to-last. Some argue this placed them at the top of the league.

This was Penn's first year in Division I-AA, after having competed in the top-level Division I-A and its predecessors since 1876.

After starting the year with three wins, the Quakers made several appearances in the weekly Division I-AA top 20 rankings. They were ranked No. 17 for the last week of the Ivy League season, but were unranked in the final rankings, which were released after their season-ending loss to Cornell.

Penn played its home games at Franklin Field adjacent to the university's campus in Philadelphia, Pennsylvania.

Schedule

References

Penn
Penn Quakers football seasons
Ivy League football champion seasons
Penn Quakers football